Hancock County is the southernmost county of the U.S. state of Mississippi and is named for Founding Father John Hancock. As of the 2020 census, the population was 46,053. Its county seat is Bay St. Louis. 

Hancock County is part of the Gulfport–Biloxi, MS Metropolitan Statistical Area. It is situated along the Gulf of Mexico and the state line with Louisiana. The area is home to the John C. Stennis Space Center, NASA's largest rocket engine test facility.

The county was severely damaged from Hurricane Katrina on August 29, 2005, which caused a huge storm surge and catastrophic damage.

History
This area of Mississippi was inhabited by indigenous peoples at the time of European colonization; the French were the first settlers and traders in the area. They imported African slaves as laborers, and in time a Creole class of free people of color developed.

After the United States conducted Indian Removal in the 1830s, more Protestant Americans migrated into this area, but it retained French and African Catholic influences. Located on the Gulf Coast, the county was regularly hit by hurricanes but its residents learned to handle these incidents.

In 2005, the county was the scene of the final landfall of the eye of Hurricane Katrina, and its communities and infrastructure suffered some of the most intense damage inflicted by that storm.  Over the entire  beach front, not one building or home was left intact.  Nearly the entire first block off the beach was destroyed for the entire  stretch. 

All rivers and waterways were inundated by the surge. Highway 603 south from Interstate 10 was completely submerged, and the Highway 90 - Bay St. Louis Bridge was left looking like a stack of dominoes.

Houses were floated off their foundations. In Waveland and Bay St. Louis, some homes were stranded atop the railroad tracks and others in the middle of streets. Towns like Pearlington, Waveland, Bay St. Louis, Diamondhead, and Kiln suffered catastrophic damage.

Recovery from Hurricane Katrina

A loosely knit group of hippies called the "Rainbow Family" arrived in Hancock County soon after Hurricane Katrina. From early September 2005 to early December 2005, they ran the "New Waveland Cafe and Clinic"    located in the parking lot of Fred's Dept Store on Highway 90.

The café provided free hot meals three times a day. The clinic was staffed by volunteer doctors and nurses from around the United States who saw more than 5000 patients during the duration. They provided treatment free of charge and dispensed free medications. Donations of medications and supplies came from a multitude of sources, with International Aid  arranging the most donations. This was the first experience of the Rainbow Family in running a disaster relief center. The Bastrop Christian Outreach Center also volunteered with the Rainbow Family.

Local churches were central points of recovery in Bay St. Louis, Waveland, and Diamondhead. Some churches provided shelter, meals, clothing, and various clean-up supplies. The churches also provided distribution points where supplies could be donated and easily passed on to those who needed help. Other disaster relief agencies that were active in Hancock County include Samaritan's Purse, Southern Baptist Convention Disaster Relief, Red Cross, Rotary International and Salvation Army.

Businesses became operational as quickly as possible. The Waveland Wal-Mart operated out of a tent for 3 months following the storm; Diamondhead Discount Drug was opened within 2 days following Katrina, although the owner's store and home were both severely damaged. Other business such as Dairy Queen and Subway donated their foodstuffs, before it could spoil, in order to feed survivors.

Geography

Major highways
  Interstate 10
  U.S. Highway 90
  Mississippi Highway 43
  Mississippi Highway 53
  Mississippi Highway 603
  Mississippi Highway 607

Adjacent counties and parishes
 Pearl River County (north)
 Harrison County (east)
 St. Bernard Parish, Louisiana (south)
 St. Tammany Parish, Louisiana (west)

Demographics

2020 census

As of the 2020 United States census, there were 46,053 people, 20,036 households, and 13,081 families residing in the county.

2000 census
As of the census of 2000, there were 42,967 people, 16,897 households, and 11,827 families residing in the county.  The population density was 90 people per square mile (35/km2).  There were 21,072 housing units at an average density of 44 per square mile (17/km2).  The racial makeup of the county was 90.19% White, 6.83% Black or African American, 0.60% Native American, 0.88% Asian, 0.04% Pacific Islander, 0.33% from other races, and 1.14% from two or more races.  1.80% of the population were Hispanic or Latino of any race.

There were 16,897 households, out of which 31.50% had children under the age of 18 living with them, 53.90% were married couples living together, 11.30% had a female householder with no husband present, and 30.00% were non-families. 24.70% of all households were made up of individuals, and 9.20% had someone living alone who was 65 years of age or older.  The average household size was 2.52 and the average family size was 2.99.

In the county, the population was spread out, with 25.10% under the age of 18, 7.30% from 18 to 24, 28.00% from 25 to 44, 25.60% from 45 to 64, and 14.00% who were 65 years of age or older.  The median age was 38 years. For every 100 females, there were 98.30 males.  For every 100 females age 18 and over, there were 95.50 males.

The median income for a household in the county was $35,202, and the median income for a family was $40,307. Males had a median income of $32,229 versus $22,066 for females. The per capita income for the county was $17,748.  About 11.20% of families and 14.40% of the population were below the poverty line, including 17.90% of those under age 18 and 10.30% of those age 65 or over.

Hancock County has the eighth highest per capita income in the State of Mississippi.

Communities

Cities
 Bay St. Louis (county seat)
 Diamondhead
 Waveland

Census-designated places
 Kiln
 Pearlington

Unincorporated communities
 Ansley
 Clermont Harbor
 Lakeshore
 Leetown
 Napoleon
 Necaise
 Shoreline Park (former CDP)

Ghost towns
 Gainesville
 Logtown

Politics

Education
School districts include:
 Bay St. Louis School District
 Hancock County School District
 Picayune School District

See also
 National Register of Historic Places listings in Hancock County, Mississippi

References

External links
 Hancock County Library System
 Hancock County Sheriff's Office
 Hancock County School District

 
Mississippi counties
Gulfport–Biloxi metropolitan area
1812 establishments in Mississippi Territory
Populated places established in 1812